The 1994–95 season was the 80th season of the Isthmian League, which is an English football competition featuring semi-professional and amateur clubs from London, East and South East England. League consisted of four divisions.

Premier Division

The Premier Division consisted of 22 clubs, including 18 clubs from the previous season and four new clubs:
 Bishop's Stortford, promoted as champions of Division One
 Purfleet, promoted as runners-up in Division One
 Slough Town, relegated from the Football Conference
 Walton & Hersham, promoted as third in Division One

League table

Division One

Division One consisted of 22 clubs, including 16 clubs from the previous season and six new clubs:

Clubs relegated from the Premier Division:
 Basingstoke Town
 Dorking
 Wivenhoe Town

Clubs promoted from Division Two:
 Aldershot Town
 Chertsey Town
 Newbury Town

At the end of the season Leyton who merged with Walthamstow Pennant and formed new club Leyton Pennant.

League table

Division Two

Division Two consisted of 22 clubs, including 16 clubs from the previous season and six new clubs:

Clubs relegated from Division One:
 Chalfont St Peter
 Croydon
 Windsor & Eton

Clubs promoted from the Third Division:
 Bracknell Town
 Cheshunt
 Oxford City

At the end of the season Malden Vale resigned from the league and merged into Raynes Park to form a new club Raynes Park Vale, who joined Combined Counties League.

League table

Division Three

Division Three consisted of 21 clubs, including 17 clubs from the previous season and four new clubs:
 Bedford Town, joined from the South Midlands League
 Canvey Island, joined from the Essex Senior League
 Collier Row, relegated from Division Two
 Lewes, relegated from Division Two

At the end of the season Feltham & Hounslow resigned from the league and joined the Combined Counties League. Also, club was renamed back into Feltham.

League table

See also
Isthmian League
1994–95 Northern Premier League
1994–95 Southern Football League

References

Isthmian League seasons
6